Miss Universe Myanmar is an annual national beauty pageant that selects Myanmar's representative to the annual Miss Universe contest.

The reigning Miss Universe Myanmar is Zar Li Moe of Bhamo, who was crowned on October 1, 2022 at the Grand Ballroom, Novotel Hotel, in Yangon.

History
Miss Universe Myanmar 2013 was held on 3 October 2013 at the National Theatre in Yangon. The winner Moe Set Wine became the first woman to represent the country in the competition since 1961. In 2015, Miss Universe Myanmar Organization crowned two winners to compete in Miss Universe 2015 and Miss Universe 2016 pageants. International Crowns 
 One – Face of Beauty International winner: Myint-Mo May (2018)

Titleholders 

Winners by City/Town

Runner-Up

 Winner Gallery 

Titleholders under Miss Myanmar org.
Color keys

 Miss Universe Myanmar
 The winner of Miss Universe Myanmar represents her country at the Miss Universe. On occasion, when the winner does not qualify (due to age) for either contest, a runner-up is sent.

Miss Grand International

Miss Charm

Miss Intercontinental

Face of Beauty International

World Beauty Queen Myanmar

Miss Tourism Queen Myanmar

See also 
 Miss Burma (1947–1962)
 Miss World Myanmar
 Miss International Myanmar
 Miss Earth Myanmar
 Miss Supranational Myanmar
 Miss Grand Myanmar
 Mister Myanmar

References

External links

 

 
Recurring events established in 2013
Burmese awards
Myanmar
Beauty pageants in Myanmar